Ocellularia subleucina is a species of  corticolous (bark-dwelling) lichen in the family Graphidaceae. Found in south-eastern Thailand, it was formally described as a new species in 2002 by lichenologists Natsurang Homchantara and Brian J. Coppins. The lichen has a smooth to finely wrinkled, grey olivaceous thallus with a dense cortex and a white medulla. It does not contain any lichen substances. The specific epithet subleucina refers to its similarity with Ocellularia leucina, a lookalike species with smaller ascospores that contains psoromic acid.

See also
 List of Ocellularia species

References

subleucina
Lichen species
Lichens described in 2002
Lichens of Thailand
Taxa named by Brian John Coppins
Taxa named by Natsurang Homchantara